Neil Buckley (born 25 September 1968) is an English former professional footballer who played as a defender. He began his career with Hull City, where he spent six seasons in the first team. During the 1989–90 season he had a spell on loan with Lancashire-based club Burnley. After leaving Hull in 1992, Buckley moved into non-League football, assisting Brigg Town, where he won the FA Vase in 1996, and North Ferriby United. Between 2003 and 2008 he was manager of Barton Town Old Boys.

Career
Buckley started his career at his hometown club Hull City, where he came through the youth ranks before making his first-team debut in January 1987 in a Second Division fixture against Plymouth Argyle. After missing the 1987–88 season, he made 23 league appearances for Hull over the following two campaigns before joining Fourth Division side Burnley on a short-term loan in March 1990. He was handed his debut by Burnley manager Frank Casper for the match away at Peterborough United. It was an inauspicious start for Buckley as the team lost 1–4, with one of the opposition's goals coming from a penalty kick that he conceded. He made four further appearances for the Turf Moor club before returning to Hull at the end of the 1989–90 season.

During the 1990–91 season Buckley established himself as a regular starter in the Hull side, scoring twice in 31 league matches. However, the season was ultimately unsuccessful for the club as they finished bottom of the Second Division and were relegated to the third tier of English football for the first time in six years. Buckley played just five times the following season before being released by Hull in the summer of 1992. He subsequently moved into non-League football with Brigg Town, where he remained for several years. In May 1996 he was part of the Brigg side that won the FA Vase, beating Clitheroe 3–0 in the final at Wembley Stadium. He later had a spell with North Ferriby United.

Buckley later moved into football management, joining Barton Town Old Boys in 2003. He led the team to a Central Midlands League championship in 2005–06 and earned promotion to the Northern Counties East League before resigning as manager in July 2008 due to other work commitments.

Football League statistics

Honours
Brigg Town
FA Vase: 1996

Barton Town Old Boys
Central Midlands League champions: 2005–06

References

1968 births
Living people
Footballers from Kingston upon Hull
English footballers
Association football defenders
Hull City A.F.C. players
Burnley F.C. players
Brigg Town F.C. players
North Ferriby United A.F.C. players
English Football League players
English football managers
Barton Town F.C. managers